Sant'Agostino is a Romanesque-style brick church in central Prato, Tuscany, Italy.

An oratory and small Augustinian monastery had been present on the site since 1271. Construction of the church lasted until 1440. New altars were built in the 16th and 17th century. It became a parish church upon the suppression of the convent in 1810. Since 1964, it has belonged to the Sacramentine order.

References

Roman Catholic churches completed in 1440
15th-century Roman Catholic church buildings in Italy
Roman Catholic churches in Prato
1271 establishments in Europe
13th-century establishments in Italy